Duntroon (from ) is a small farming-town in the Waitaki District of New Zealand's South Island.  Although traditionally considered a North Otago town, it is located  within the farthest southern reaches of Canterbury.  Just north of the town runs the Waitaki River, which forms the traditional border between the two regions, although the official border has moved south to put most of Waitaki District within Canterbury, including Duntroon.  To the east of the village runs the Maerewhenua River.  Near the village are the Earthquakes, a limestone-cliff formation.

The town was named by Scottish settler and farmer Robert Campbell.  Economic activity has been mainly agricultural for much of the town's history, focusing primarily on sheep farming and on the growing of crops such as wheat and barley.

Duntroon is home to the Vanished World Heritage Centre, dedicated to showcasing the geology of the Waitaki region and preserving fossils of extinct species that have been found in the region.  These include two species of the penguin genus Archaeospheniscus, Lowe's penguin and Lopdell's penguin, found in the Kokoamu Greensand formation.  The town is also located near two sites of centuries-old Māori rock drawings, one of which being the Takiroa Rock Art Shelter.

 south of Duntroon, in the Maerewhenua Valley, a group of large rock-formations called "Elephant Rocks" was used as a filming location for the first  Chronicles of Narnia movie in 2005.  The rock formations, located in a private field, are visible from the road.

Transport 
Duntroon was once the terminus of the branch line railway that ultimately became the Kurow Branch, and was one of the few towns to be served by a railway station for the entire life of the line (most others were closed earlier than the line itself).  In 1875, the railway from the junction with the Main South Line at Pukeuri was opened to Duntroon, but due to bridging difficulties, the line terminated outside Duntroon on the east side of the Maerewhenua River.  In 1878, construction began on another line from Duntroon to Kurow; on 2 July 1881, the Maerewhenua River was bridged and Duntroon was linked to the national railway network; on 7 November 1881, the line beyond Duntroon opened and the town lost its status as terminus.  The railway served the town for over a century, closing in mid-1983, and the old railway station now serves as boutique accommodation for fly fishermen and cyclists on the A2O cycle trail.  Near the station building, an old water tank for steam locomotives still stands in good condition.

Duntroon is on the route of the Alps to Ocean Cycle Trail, which was constructed from 2011 after approval in 2010.

Demographics
It is part of the larger Danseys Pass statistical area.

Duntroon had a population of 96 at the 2018 New Zealand census, an increase of 21 people (28.0%) since the 2013 census, and a decrease of 3 people (-3.0%) since the 2006 census. There were 39 households. There were 51 males and 45 females, giving a sex ratio of 1.13 males per female. The median age was 46.0 years (compared with 37.4 years nationally), with 18 people (18.8%) aged under 15 years, 18 (18.8%) aged 15 to 29, 48 (50.0%) aged 30 to 64, and 15 (15.6%) aged 65 or older.

Ethnicities were 93.8% European/Pākehā, 6.2% Māori, and 6.2% Asian (totals add to more than 100% since people could identify with multiple ethnicities).

Although some people objected to giving their religion, 50.0% had no religion, 34.4% were Christian and 6.2% had other religions.

Of those at least 15 years old, 6 (7.7%) people had a bachelor or higher degree, and 24 (30.8%) people had no formal qualifications. The median income was $22,200, compared with $31,800 nationally. The employment status of those at least 15 was that 36 (46.2%) people were employed full-time, 15 (19.2%) were part-time, and 3 (3.8%) were unemployed.

Education
Duntroon School is a full primary school catering for years 1 to 8, with a roll of  students as of  The school opened in 1879.

References

External links 

 Vanished World Centre website
 Visitor's Guide to the Beautiful Waitaki – Duntroon
 Nicol's Blacksmith Historic Trust website

Populated places in Canterbury, New Zealand
Waitaki District